The 2020–21 FIS Alpine Ski Continental Cup (AOC) was a season of the FIS Alpine Ski Continental Cup, a series of second-level alpine skiing competitions arranged by the International Ski Federation (FIS).

Winners
The overall winners from the 2020–21 season's Continental Cups are rewarded a right to start in the first period in the following 2021–22 World Cup season.

Men

Women

Results

Men

European Cup

Nor-Am Cup

Far East Cup

South American Cup

Australia-New Zealand Cup

Women

European Cup

Nor-Am Cup

Far East Cup

South American Cup

Australia-New Zealand Cup

References

2020 in alpine skiing
2021 in alpine skiing